Yuanshen could refer to:

Places
Yuanshen Sports Centre Stadium, a multi-purpose stadium in Shanghai
Yuanshen Stadium station, a station on Line 6 of the Shanghai Metro
Yuanshen Road station, a station under construction on the future Line 14 of the Shanghai Metro

Other uses
Genshin Impact (Chinese: 原神; pinyin: Yuánshén), a video game developed by Mihoyo.
 yuanshen (Chinese: 元神), one of the "three origins" in Chinese traditional medicine
Yuan-Shih Chow (Chinese: 周元燊, Pinyin: Zhōu Yuánshēn),  a Chinese American probabilist